Muhammad Zia and variants may refer to:

Muhammad Zia-ul-Haq (1924  – 1988), 4th Chief Martial Law Administrator and 6th President of Pakistan
Mohammed Zia Salehi, chief of administration for the National Security Council in Afghanistan.